Zaragoza Airport (Aragonese and) is an international airport near Zaragoza, Aragón, Spain. In addition to serving as a major cargo airport it is also a commercial airport and the home of the Spanish Air and Space Force 15th Group.

History

During the Cold War, the United States Air Force (USAF) used the facility as Zaragoza Air Base.

The construction work on Zaragoza Airport began in September 1954 with the enlargement and improvement of the existing Spanish Air Force Base located there. United States Navy engineers upgraded the facility for temporary or intermediate use as a war standby base. The first U.S. construction project included strengthening the existing  runway and adding  overruns at each end. Work on a new concrete runway, with  overruns at each end, began in 1956 and was completed in 1958.

Zaragoza was one of three major USAF Cold War airbases in Spain, the others being Torrejón Air Base near Madrid and Morón Air Base near Seville.

The airport was also used by NASA as a contingency landing site for the Space Shuttle in the case of a Transoceanic Abort Landing (TAL). Zaragoza was chosen as a NASA Space Shuttle TAL site due to its long runway, which needs be longer than 7,500 feet, its pleasant weather, and alignment with Shuttle launches to the high-inclination International Space Station orbit. The base also has a military-grade navigation system called a TACAN—"Tactical Air Navigation"—that can adapt to the special guidance devices NASA used with its shuttles.

Airlines and destinations

Passenger

Cargo

Statistics

Access 
Currently, the airport is connected to the city center by a bus line (501), which goes from the Puerta del Carmen square, downtown, to the airport, also stopping at the city's main railway station: Zaragoza-Delicias. This train station is an important hub for long-distance trains, AVE high-speed trains and the commuter line of Cercanías Zaragoza, which takes passengers underground through the city and overground in the metropolitan area. In February 2023, Zaragoza mayor's office confirmed plans to create a direct bus service "on demand" from June 2023. This line will be serviced by electric buses to start and will significantly reduce journey distances and the duration (it will be about 12 or 13 kilometers depending on the direction). Schedules of these buses will be coordinated with those of the flights scheduled at the airport.

References

External links

  
 
 
 

Airports in Aragon
Buildings and structures in Zaragoza
Transport in Zaragoza
Space Shuttle Emergency Landing Sites